Maadi Veettu Mappillai is a 1967 Indian Tamil-language comedy film, directed by S. K. A. Chari. A remake of the Telugu film Illarikam (1959), it stars Ravichandran and Jayalalithaa, with Nagesh, Rama Prabha, V. K. Ramasamy, Balaji, Major Sundarrajan, T. S. Muthaiah, Udaya Chandrika and P. K. Saraswathy in supporting roles. The film was released on 23 June 1967.

Plot 

Somu studies with the help of his maternal uncle Dharmalingam. He falls in love with the daughter of a Sivagnanam i.e. Meena. He gets married to her and stays in their house as Veettu Mappilai. Sivagnanam's wife does not like this and insults him indirectly. Her cousin plots to usurp the wealth, by his son Balu who secretly married Seetha. Somu spots Seetha, his presumed to be dead sister while she was performing on stage. Not knowing they are siblings, Meena suspects Somu's fidelity. Balu and his father creates problems between Somu and Meena. How Somu solves all the problems and paves way for a happy family reunion forms the rest of the film.

Cast 
 Ravichandran as Somu
 Jayalalithaa as Meena
 Nagesh as Shankaran
 Rama Prabha as Gowri
 V. K. Ramasamy as Dharmalingam
 Balaji as Balu
 Major Sundarrajan as Sivagnanam
 T. S. Muthaiah as Sadatcharam
 Udaya Chandrika as Seetha
 P. K. Saraswathy as Nagamma

Soundtrack 
The music was composed by T. Chalapathi Rao.

Release and reception 
Maadi Veettu Mappilai was released on 23 June 1967, and distributed by Sri Vinayaka Movies. Kalki noted that the film's various flaws were eclipsed by its comedy.

References

Bibliography

External links 
 

1960s Tamil-language films
1966 comedy films
1967 films
Films scored by T. Chalapathi Rao
Indian black-and-white films
Indian comedy films
Tamil remakes of Telugu films